Polygala linariifolia is a species of flowering plant in the milkwort family (Polygalaceae). It is endemic to Australia, predominantly in New South Wales and Queensland.

References 

linariifolia